James Dawson (June 5, 1823 – November 3, 1886) was an Ontario political figure. He represented Kent in the Legislative Assembly of Ontario as a Liberal member from 1871 to 1874.

He served as warden for Lambton County. He died of bladder cancer in 1886. At the time of his death he had been serving as postmaster for Sarnia. He was buried at Our Lady of Mercy Roman Catholic Cemetery in Lambton County.

References

External links 
Member's parliamentary history for the Legislative Assembly of Ontario
The Canadian parliamentary companion and annual register, 1874, HJ Morgan

Ontario Liberal Party MPPs
1823 births
1886 deaths
Deaths from bladder cancer
Deaths from cancer in Ontario